Moges Kebede (Amharic: ሞገስ ከበደ), sometimes credited as Moges Kebede Damte or Moges Damte, is an Ethiopian author, essayist, and editor. He is the publisher of Mestawet Ethiopian Newspaper, a monthly magazine for the Ethiopian immigrant community in the United States.

Life
Moges Kebede was born and raised in Addis Ababa, the capital of Ethiopia. After finishing high school, he worked as a freelance writer, contributing articles for various private newspapers and magazines and writing plays for local theaters.

The early 1990s was a burgeoning period in the history of Ethiopian writing and journalism. The military junta led by Mengistu Haile Mariam collapsed and was overthrown by a rebel group, the Tigrayan People's Liberation Front (TPLF), which later evolved into the coalition Ethiopian People's Revolutionary Democratic Front (EPRDF) that formed the transitional government.

This transition period, with its absence of governmental interference, effectively ended the almost two-decade-old ban of private media and publications. This created an opportunity for many to actively write and participate in the country's newfound free speech movement. But just a few years later, the government would eventually start to curtail some of the freedom-of-press rights which it had initially allowed to mushroom.

During these first few years, the country saw a new wave of writers, a flood of private newspapers and magazines, and the formation of the Ethiopian Free Press Journalists' Association or EFJA. It was during this time that Moges' work was widely published, and his writings started to appear in various citywide Addis Ababa publications . He also participated in the formation of the EFJA. In 1992, Moges published his first book, a crime novel titled Damotra, which he financed himself. The book received great reviews and popularity.

In April 1996, Moges immigrated to Minneapolis, Minnesota, where in April 2001 he established Mestawet Ethiopian Newspaper, the first monthly citywide Amharic language magazine with 150 copies. Though there had been past attempts to publish magazines geared toward the Ethiopian community in the Twin Cities, Mestawet was the first to achieve regular publication and become widely distributed to the area's estimated 15,000 or more immigrants from Ethiopia and Eritrea.

Beginning in 2004, Mestawet expanded its distribution throughout the U.S., reaching readers in Los Angeles, Seattle, Washington, D.C., Dallas, Denver, Atlanta, Columbus, and Portland.

By April 2005, Mestawet’s circulation had increased to 8,000 copies.

Literary works
 Damotra, a novel

External links
 VOA Interview on 8 March 2005 (WMA file)
 Mestawet website
 Ethiopian Free Press Journalists' Association (EFJA)

Living people
People from Addis Ababa
Ethiopian essayists
Ethiopian emigrants to the United States
Year of birth missing (living people)
Ethiopian journalists